Don't Hug Me I'm Scared (often abbreviated as DHMIS) is a British web and television series created by Becky Sloan, Joe Pelling, and Baker Terry. The series is notable for its blending of surreal comedy and black comedy with psychological horror and comedy horror, as well as incorporating musicals. Its production is also notable for diversity, combining puppetry, live action, and other different styles of animation including stop motion, traditional animation, flash animation, clay animation, and computer animation. The original series consisted of 6 short episodes released from 29 July 2011 to 19 June 2016 on YouTube. A follow-up television series was released in 2022 on All 4 and Channel 4.

In the series, each episode starts like a typical children's series, consisting of anthropomorphic puppets akin to those featured in Sesame Street or The Muppets. The series parodies and satirises these TV programmes by contrasting its childlike, colourful environment and its inhabitants against disturbing themes; each episode features a surreal plot twist in the climax, including psychedelic content and imagery involving graphic violence, dark humour, existentialism, and psychological horror.

The six episodes of the web series explore and discuss basic subjects typically found in preschool, namely creativity, time, love, technology, diet, and dreams, while the television series touched on jobs, death, family, friendship, transport, and electricity. The web series received widespread acclaim for its story, production design, psychological horror, humour, hidden themes, lore, and characters, and is regarded by many as one of the greatest web series of all time. The television series was met with similar acclaim.

Premise
Each episode revolves around three characters: a yellow childlike humanoid with blue hair and overalls, an anthropomorphic green mallard duck with a tweed jacket, and a red humanoid with a mop-like head. They have no names explicitly stated within the series but are often referred to as Yellow Guy, Duck and Red Guy respectively. The characters only ever refer to each other with pronouns, never by name. Yellow Guy's father, Roy, also occasionally appears. An episode typically goes with the three main characters meeting one or several anthropomorphic characters, who begin a musical number related to a basic concept of day-to-day life with an upbeat melody, similar to that of a Sesame Street segment. As each song progresses, it becomes apparent that its moral or message is nonsensical and self-contradicting, and that the "teacher" character has ulterior sinister motives. The climax of each episode typically involves a plot twist involving the addition of escalating psychological horror, which then culminates into gore and graphic violence. Later in the series, the characters begin questioning the nature of their reality and the bizarre messages of the teachers.

Production
Sloan, Terry and Pelling met while studying Fine Art and Animation respectively at Kingston University, where they started THIS IS IT Collective with some friends. They produced the first episode of Don't Hug Me I'm Scared in their free time with no budget. When they started on the project they imagined making it into a series, but initially dropped the idea after finishing the first episode. After the short film gained popularity, they decided to revisit that idea. Channel 4's Random Acts commissioned the second episode. The show soon attracted mainstream commissioners; however, Sloan and Pelling turned these offers down because they "wanted to keep it fairly odd" and "have the freedom to do exactly what we wanted".

In May 2014, Sloan and Pelling announced that they would start a Kickstarter fundraising campaign to make four or more additional episodes, one every three months, starting in September 2014. They uploaded low-quality camera footage of the characters being taken hostage and held for ransom. A 12-year-old American boy tried to use hacked credit card information to donate £35,000 to the campaign, but he was caught and those funds were thrown out. Their Kickstarter goal of £96,000 was reached on 19 June 2014, and in total £104,935 was raised. YouTuber TomSka became an executive producer on the series after donating £5,000 to the Kickstarter.

In January 2016, Sloan and Pelling collaborated with Lazy Oaf to release a line of clothing based on the characters and themes of the show.

Television series 
On 19 June 2017, a year after the release of episode 6, Sloan hinted towards additional work into the Don't Hug Me I'm Scared series. A teaser trailer titled "Wakey Wakey..." was released on the channel on 13 September 2018, teasing a new television show made in a collaboration between Blink Industries, Conaco, and Super Deluxe. The 30-second video gained over two million views within 24 hours of its release and peaked at No. 1 on YouTube's Trending list. Details of the plot were released on 3 December 2018 in advance of a 2019 Sundance Film Festival screening of the pilot. The pilot episode ran at 23 minutes, and it appeared in the "Indie Episodic Program 1" alongside other short films. On 24 May 2022, the trailer was made private on the official YouTube channel.

On 7 July 2020, it was officially announced that the series had been picked up by Channel 4. The series wrapped up filming by September 2021, and it was expected to be originally released streaming exclusively on All 4 on 12 September 2022. However, the series was delayed slightly because of the death of Queen Elizabeth II. On 16 September 2022, it was announced that the series would be releasing on 23 September 2022 on All 4 and premiered 30 September 2022 on Channel 4.

Episodes 
All episodes were written by Becky Sloan and Joe Pelling, with Baker Terry co-writing each episode starting with "Time". "Time" is also co-written by Hugo Donkin.

Web series (2011–2016)

Pilot (2018) 
A long-form TV pilot was produced in 2018 with Super Deluxe, Conaco and Blink Industries. The pilot premiered at 2019 Sundance Film Festival, appearing in the "Indie Episodic Program 1" alongside other short films. The idea, which involved "current affairs", was later scrapped, and the trailer was removed from the YouTube channel. The setting, which Sloan attributed some roots to South Park, did not have "the timelessness and claustrophobia of the originals."

Television series (2022) 
All episodes for this series are co-written by Sam Campbell.

Themes
In a faux interview, Becky and Joe jokingly described the plot as "three best friends who go on a journey to find a magic pirate ship and save the day".

A student writer for Nouse compared the appeal of the first episode to themes in Gothic literature, arguing that they are both "tapping into the same cultural fear of a violent subconscious hiding beneath the façade of normality". In The Wesleyan Argus, another student writer called the series a "fine example of the era of esotericism" and noted that, "There is a building meta-commentary on the relationships between viewer, perception, creator, participant, and art (and perhaps death) that began with the first episode, but what that commentary is trying to say is not yet entirely clear. However, there is an absolute sense that the series is building toward a culmination."

Cast

YouTube series cast 
 Baker Terry as Yellow Guy, Duck, Tony the Talking Clock, Shrignold, Steak and Lamp
 Becky Sloan as Sketchbook and Spinach Can
 Joseph Pelling as Red Guy and Colin the Computer

Cameos 
 TomSka as Magnet
 Kellen Goff as Shovel

Sundance pilot cast 

 Baker Terry as Yellow Guy, Duck, Key, Mayor Pigface, Security Thing, Policeman, Big Ian, and Fizzy Milk
 Joseph Pelling as Red Guy
 Becky Sloan as Mrs. Grenald, Mud Man, and Ladder

Channel 4 series cast 

 Baker Terry as Yellow Guy, Duck, Briefcase, Andy, Duncan, Bin, Lucky Mo, Family Tree, Roy Gribbleston, Warren The Eagle, Yumpherdinker, Dr. Bushman, Choo Choo Train, Tony the Talking Clock, Steak, Big Duck and Bigger Duck
 Joseph Pelling as Red Guy, Colin the Computer, Brain Friends Theme Singer, Brain Friends Announcer, Big Red Guy and Bigger Red Guy
 Becky Sloan as Unemployed Brendon, Stain Edwards, Grolton's Chicken Family Tub Discount Commericial Announcer, Brain Friends Theme Singer, First Tooth, The Lump and Electracey
 Vivienne Soan as Lesley
 Leila Navabi as Claire
 Amy Gledhill as Wet Floor Sign
 Kath Hughes as Printer
 Phil Wang as Vending Machine
 Jen Ives as Free Vending Machine
 Chris Cantrill as Safety Video Announcer
 Lolly Adefope as Lift and Mrs. Grelch
 Charlie Perkins as Jenny
 Kevin Eldon as Coffin
 Sue Eves as Brain Friends Theme Singer (uncredited)
 George Fouracres as Lamp, Grolton and Hovris
 Sam Campbell as ID Card and Apple
 Katy Wix as Tissue Box
 Freya Parker as Grandma and Bread
 James Stevenson Bretton as Lily and Todney
 Liam Williams as Market Man
 Emma Sidi as Bubble Bath Memory
 Kiell Smith-Bynoe as Saturdavid
 Johnny White Really-Really as Shy Imaginary Older Brother
 Charlie Pelling as Brain Friends Theme Singer
 Chris Hayward as Instructional Tape Announcer
 Katie Kvinge as GPS
 Jimmy Slim as Time Child
 Jamie Demetriou as Safe
 Michael Stranney as Mirror
 Beattie Hartley as Experimented Creature
 Jason Forbes as Boundary Hand
 Natasha Hodgson as Rock
 Nathan Foad as Toilet

Reception

Web series
The series as a whole has received widespread critical acclaim. Scott Beggs listed the original short film as number 8 on his list of the 11 best short films of 2011. Carolina Mardones listed the first episode as number 7 in her top ten short films of 2011. It was also included as part of a cinema event in Banksy's Dismaland. In April 2016, the main characters of the series were featured on the cover of the magazine Printed Pages, along with an "interview" of the three main characters written by the magazine's editor. All six episodes of DHMIS were included in the September 2016 festival XOXO.

Drew Grant of The Observer described the series as "mind-melting". Freelance writer Benjamin Hiorns observed that "it's not the subject matter that makes these films so strangely alluring, it's the strikingly imaginative set and character design and the underlying Britishness of it all". Joe Blevins of The A.V. Club praised the show's "sense-to-nonsense ratio" and its production values. Samantha Joy of TenEighty praised the sixth episode of the series, writing that it "creates a provocative end to a pretty dark narrative about content creation".

Television series
Like the web series, the television series has also received critical acclaim. Toussaint Egan of Polygon states, "Don't Hug Me I'm Scared could be described as the demented British half-cousin of Sesame Street and the heir apparent to Wonder Showzen, albeit less politically charged than the latter and more focused on taking a sledgehammer to the standard of children's educational television". 

Don't Hug Me I'm Scared has been named as one of the best TV shows of 2022 by several publications. The Telegraph ranked it at number 20, saying it was "unlucky not to be (in the top 10)". The Guardian ranked it at number 31, calling it "clever, bleak, charming, grotesque and funny". Radio Times ranked it at number 42, praising its "creepy and mysterious spin on vintage children’s television, brought vividly to life through inventive crafts and puppetry".

The series was nominated for Best Scripted Comedy Show at the 2023 National Comedy Awards.

Creators
Becky Sloan and Joseph Pelling are British graphic designers, artists and animators. Their advertising runs through commercial productions. The duo have worked as part of the THIS IS IT Collective.

Their content consists of videos, graphic design art, animation, music, and working with real-life materials to resemble things in the real world as art. They have won multiple awards, including the 2012 SXSW Midnight Shorts Award, and the 2016 ADC Young Guns award.

They have also co-written and did puppeteer work for Cartoon Network's The Amazing World of Gumball episode "The Puppets" (season five, episode 36). Sloan and Baker Terry provided voices of Grady, Frank, and Howdy (the three puppets featured in the episode, who trap the main characters Gumball and Darwin in their world). This episode features a song where the puppets sing about never-ending fun to Darwin with toned-down disturbing content similar to the Don't Hug Me I'm Scared series in theme. A series of shorts based on the episode followed, titled Waiting for Gumball, made by the same team as the original TV episode.

See also
 Wonder Showzen
 Happy Tree Friends

Notes

References

External links
 Official YouTube channel
 Becky and Joe's website

2010s YouTube series
2011 web series debuts
2016 web series endings
2020s British black comedy television series
2020s British horror television series
2022 British television series debuts
British animated short films
British surreal comedy television series
Channel 4 comedy
Channel 4 original programming
Kickstarter-funded web series
Surrealist television series
Television shows featuring puppetry
Viral videos
Web series featuring puppetry
Works with live action and animation
YouTube channels launched in 2011